Delves is a village in England.

Delves may also refer to:
 Delves baronets, a former baronetcy of England
 Delves Hall, Doddington, Cheshire, England
 Delves Lane, a village in County Durham, England
 The Delves, a neighbourhood in Walsall, West Midlands, England
 Cedric Delves (1947), retired British Army officer
 Thomas Delves (disambiguation)